The Abra de Río Frío Natural Monument Is a protected natural space located in the municipality of San Cristóbal, in the state of Táchira, Venezuela. Received the status of natural monument on February 18, 1993.

The natural space aims to protect the geological and orographic structure of the open cold river, the only natural step through the Andean Cordilleras, linking the high western plains and tectonic Táchira depression.

The area is of a very populated vegetation, whose flora plays a regulating role of the microclimatic conditions in its surroundings. The Cerros de Blanquisal are known for their scenic beauty. Close to its borders, which extend to the banks of the river Uribante, join the rivers Frío and Quinimari.

The natural area also protects the transitability of the road that connects San Cristóbal with the regions of the Uribante.

See also
List of national parks of Venezuela
Meseta la Galera Natural Monument
Teta de Niquitao-Guirigay Natural Monument

References

Natural monuments of Venezuela
Protected areas established in 1993